Renzo Giovampietro (23 June 1924 – 10 March 2006) was an Italian actor, theatre director and playwright.

Life and career 
Born in Velletri, Rome, the son  of a carpenter and of a cook, in 1944 Giovampietro enrolled at the Silvio d’Amico Academy of Dramatic Arts.  He started his acting career in 1945 and was mainly active on stage, working with Luchino Visconti, Giorgio Strehler, Salvo Randone, Luigi Squarzina and Memo Benassi, among others. Occasionally also active in films and on television, from the early 1960s  Giovampietro focused his activities on adaptations of classics on stage.

Selected filmography
 I Met You in Naples (1946)
 House of Ricordi (1954)
 Don Camillo's Last Round (1955) 
 I pinguini ci guardano (1956)
 El Greco (1966)
 Sex Quartet (1966)
 The Lady of Monza (1969)
 Sandokan (1976)
 Open Doors (1990)

References

External links 

 

1924 births
2006 deaths
People from Velletri
Italian male film actors
Italian male television actors
Italian male stage actors
20th-century Italian male actors
Italian theatre directors
Italian dramatists and playwrights
Accademia Nazionale di Arte Drammatica Silvio D'Amico alumni
20th-century Italian dramatists and playwrights
Male actors from Rome